Qapan-e Sofla (also Romanized as Qapān-e Soflá; also known as Qapān-e Pā’īn, Kapan, Qapān, and Qupan) is a village in Zavkuh Rural District, Pishkamar District, Kalaleh County, Golestan Province, Iran. At the 2006 census, its population was 210, in 33 families.

References 

Populated places in Kalaleh County